Raul Uhl (8 April 1907 – 22 June 2002) was a sailor from Hungary, who represented his country at the 1928 Summer Olympics in Amsterdam, Netherlands.

Sources 
 

Sailors at the 1928 Summer Olympics – 12' Dinghy
Olympic sailors of Hungary
Hungarian male sailors (sport)
1907 births
2002 deaths
Sportspeople from Budapest